Alejandro Saab (born November 15, 1994) is an American voice actor. Some of his noteworthy roles include Tamotsu Denkigai in Akiba's Trip: The Animation, Takezo Kurata in Kono Oto Tomare! Sounds of Life, Kazuki Yasaka in Sarazanmai, Izumi Miyamura in Horimiya, Tatsuya Shiba in The Irregular at Magic High School, and Cyno from Genshin Impact. Outside of voice acting, he also runs a YouTube channel named KaggyFilms and a VTuber channel known as CyYu.

Biography
Saab was born on November 15, 1994. In high school, Saab decided he wanted to pursue a career in voice acting. He later was cast in his first role as Drake in Fairy Tail. In July 2021, Saab became engaged to fellow voice actor Hayden Daviau. In 2022 the pair married.

Outside of voice acting, Saab runs a YouTube channel under the name of KaggyFilms, where he posts anime-related content.

Filmography

Anime

Films

Video games

Animation

References

External links
 
 

1994 births
Living people
American male video game actors
American male voice actors
American people of Ecuadorian descent
American people of Lebanese descent
American YouTubers
English-language YouTube channels
Hispanic and Latino American male actors
Let's Players
21st-century American male actors